The Battle of Křeč occurred on 19 August 1435 and was the last real battle of the Hussite Wars. A year earlier, the Battle of Lipany brought an end to most Hussite power in Bohemia, but some groups had still continued fighting. Oldřich II of Rosenberg defeated the Taborites near the village of Křeč (Pelhřimov District), which brought an end to their ability to carry out attacks. After this battle the radical Hussites at Tábor began to make an agreement with Emperor Sigismund.

References
 Cornejo, Peter. Great history of the Czech lands V. 1402-1437. Prague: Paseka, 2000. 790 pp. .
 Palacký, Francis. History of the Czech Nation in Bohemia and Moravia. Prague: B. Koci, 1907. 1279 s.
 Šmahel, Francis. Hussite revolution. 3rd chronicle of the war years. Praha: Karolinum, 1996. 420 pp. .
 Toman, Hugo. Hussite warfare at the time Zizka and Prokop. Prague: Czech Royal Society of Sciences, 1898. 468 pp.

1435 in Europe
Kretsch 1435
Kretsch 1435
Kretsch
Conflicts in 1435
History of the Vysočina Region